Mapsidius quadridentata is a moth of the family Scythrididae. It is endemic to the Hawaiian islands of Lanai and Maui.

The larvae feed on Charpentiera species.

References

External links

Scythrididae
Endemic moths of Hawaii